'Equal(s) may refer to:

Mathematics
 Equality (mathematics).
 Equals sign (=), a mathematical symbol used to indicate equality.

Arts and entertainment
 Equals (film), a 2015 American science fiction film
 Equals (game), a board game
 The Equals, a British pop group formed in 1965
 "Equal", a 2016 song by Chrisette Michele from Milestone
 "Equal", a 2022 song by Odesza featuring Låpsley from The Last Goodbye
 "Equals", a 2009 song by Set Your Goals from This Will Be the Death of Us
 Equal (TV series), a 2020 American docuseries on HBO
 = (album), a 2021 album by Ed Sheeran
 "=", a 2022 song by J-Hope from Jack in the Box

Other uses
 Equal (sweetener), a brand of artificial sweetener.
 EQUAL Community Initiative, an initiative within the European Social Fund of the European Union.

See also
 Equality (disambiguation)
 Equalizer (disambiguation)
 Equalization (disambiguation)